Ella is an unincorporated community in Morrow County, Oregon, United States. Ella lies along Immigrant Lane and the Oregon Trail east of Cecil and south of Boardman.

Ella had a post office from April 24, 1882, through September 30, 1910. Established at the home of Frank Oviatt, it was named for his daughter Ella, who was told it would be named for her if she stopped crying during a post office planning session. Oviatt became the first postmaster.

References

Unincorporated communities in Morrow County, Oregon
Unincorporated communities in Oregon